Yuat Kuol Alok (born 1 January 1997) is a New Zealand professional basketball player for the New Mexico State Aggies of the Western Athletic Conference. He previously played for the TCU Horned Frogs.

Early life and career
Alok was born on January 1st, 1997, in Kenya, the second youngest of four children and one of sons of Aluel Deng. Alok’s family was Christian and he was brought up with this faith.

Alok started playing basketball when he was 14, and the Lakers were his favorite team when he was growing up. Few weeks after he was born, Yuat's mother, Aluel Deng, moved with him and his siblings to Kakuma, Kenya to escape the violence of the Second Sudanese Civil War. Almost a decade after moving to Kenya, the United Nations granted an appeal to move the refugee family to Auckland, New Zealand in 2005. Yuat became accustomed to his new lifestyle and learned to speak fluent English. He began playing basketball in his first year of high school and became a member of the New Zealand Breakers academy. In the 2014–15 season, Alok played for the Breakers in the National Basketball League (NBL) as a development player. before again he moved to the United States on a scholarship for his years of high school in order to play for Impact Academy in Sarasota, Florida. He was especially fond of New Zealand, which he considered a loving place and where some of his best childhood memories were made. Yuat began to play basketball seriously while living in New Zealand. Alok and his cousins would play videos of NBA games to study and try in the playground.

August 2014, he appeared in games during the 2014–15 NBL season and was a member of the New Zealand Breakers NBL championship-winning squad.

College career
As a freshman and sophomore, Alok played college basketball at Chipola College, where he was a second-team All-Panhandle Conference selection both years. As a sophomore, he averaged 12.3 points and seven rebounds per game. 

For his junior season, he transferred NCAA Division I program TCU, choosing the Horned Frogs over Baylor, Florida and USC. Being drawn there because head coach Jamie Dixon had previously coached his friend and countryman Steven Adams. Alok was considered the top junior college recruit in the country by JucoRecruiting.com. He played 10 games for TCU, averaging 3.3 points and 2.5 rebounds in 13.1 minutes per game, before suffering a season-ending hand injury. On 17 January 2019, Alok transferred to UCF. In December 2019, as he was set to debut for UCF, he was ruled ineligible for the remainder of the season. Alok moved to New Mexico State as a graduate transfer.

References

External links
UCF Knights bio
NM State's bio

Living people
1997 births
New Zealand people of Kenyan descent
New Zealand men's basketball players
Kenyan men's basketball players
Kenyan expatriate basketball people in the United States
Kenyan emigrants to New Zealand
New Zealand Breakers players
TCU Horned Frogs basketball players
Chipola Indians men's basketball players
Power forwards (basketball)
Centers (basketball)
New Zealand expatriate basketball people in the United States
Basketball players from Auckland